In activism and politics, woke  means "alert to racial prejudice and discrimination". Beginning in the 2010s, it came to encompass a broader awareness of social inequalities such as sexism, and has also been used as shorthand for American Left ideas involving identity politics and social justice, such as the notion of white privilege and slavery reparations for African Americans. Originating as an adjective in African-American Vernacular English (AAVE), the word may also be used as a noun.

The phrase stay woke had emerged in AAVE by the 1930s, in some contexts referring to an awareness of the social and political issues affecting African Americans. The phrase was uttered in a recording by Lead Belly and later by Erykah Badu. During the 2014 Ferguson protests, the phrase was popularized by Black Lives Matter (BLM) activists seeking to raise awareness about police shootings of African Americans. After seeing use on Black Twitter, the term woke became an Internet meme and was increasingly used by white people, often to signal their support for BLM, which some commentators have criticised as cultural appropriation. Mainly associated with the millennial generation, the term spread internationally and was added to the Oxford English Dictionary in 2017.

The terms woke-washing and woke capitalism were coined to describe companies who signal support for progressive causes as a substitute for genuine change. By 2020, members of the political center and right wing in several Western countries were using the term woke, often in an ironic way, as an insult for various progressive or leftist movements and ideologies perceived as overzealous, performative, or insincere. In turn, some commentators came to consider it an offensive term with negative associations to those who promote political ideas involving identity and race.

Origins and usage

In some varieties of African-American English, woke is used in place of woken, the usual past participle form of wake. This has led to the use of woke as an adjective equivalent to awake, which has become mainstream in the United States.

While it is not known when being awake was first used as a metaphor for political engagement and activism, one early example in the United States was the paramilitary youth organization the Wide Awakes, which formed in Hartford, Connecticut in 1860 to support the Republican candidate in the 1860 presidential election, Abraham Lincoln. Local chapters of the group spread rapidly across northern cities in the ensuing months and "triggered massive popular enthusiasm" around the election. The political militancy of the group also alarmed many southerners, who saw in the Wide Awakes confirmation of their fears of northern, Republican political aggression. The support among the Wide Awakes for abolition, as well as the participation of a number of Black men in a Wide Awakes parade in Massachusetts, likely contributed to such anxiety.

20th century

Among the earliest uses of the idea of wokeness as a concept for Black political consciousness came from Jamaican philosopher and social activist Marcus Garvey, who wrote in 1923, "Wake up Ethiopia! Wake up Africa!"

A 1923 collection of aphorisms, ideas, and other writing by Garvey also adopts this metaphor in the following epigram: "Wake up Ethiopia! Wake up Africa! Let us work towards the one glorious end of a free, redeemed and mighty nation. Let Africa be a bright star among the constellation of nations".

Black American folk singer-songwriter Huddie Ledbetter, a.k.a. Lead Belly, used the phrase "stay woke" as part of a spoken afterward to a 1938 recording of his song "Scottsboro Boys", which tells the story of nine black teenagers and young men falsely accused of raping two white women in Alabama in 1931. In the recording, Lead Belly says he met with the defendant's lawyer and the young men themselves, and "I advise everybody, be a little careful when they go along through there (Scottsboro)best stay woke, keep their eyes open." Aja Romano writes at Vox that this usage reflects "Black Americans' need to be aware of racially motivated threats and the potential dangers of white America".

By the mid-20th century, woke had come to mean 'well-informed' or 'aware', especially in a political or cultural sense. The Oxford English Dictionary traces the earliest such usage to a 1962 New York Times Magazine article titled "If You're Woke You Dig It" by African-American novelist William Melvin Kelley, describing the appropriation of Black slang by white beatniks.

Woke had gained more political connotations by 1971 when the play Garvey Lives! by Barry Beckham included the line: "I been sleeping all my life. And now that Mr. Garvey done woke me up, I'm gon' stay woke. And I'm gon help him wake up other black folk."

2000s and early 2010s, #Staywoke hashtag 
Through the 2000s and early 2010s, woke was used either as a term for literal wakefulness, or as slang for suspicions of being cheated on by a romantic partner. 
In November 2016, the singer Childish Gambino released the song "Redbone", which used the term stay woke in reference to infidelity.
In the 21st century's first decade, the use of woke encompassed the earlier meaning with an added sense of being "alert to social and/or racial discrimination and injustice".

This usage was popularized by soul singer Erykah Badu's 2008 song "Master Teacher", via the song's refrain, "I stay woke". Merriam-Webster defines the expression stay woke in Badu's song as meaning, "self-aware, questioning the dominant paradigm and striving for something better"; and, although within the context of the song, it did not yet have a specific connection to justice issues, Merriam-Webster credits the phrase's use in the song with its later connection to these issues.

Songwriter Georgia Anne Muldrow, who composed "Master Teacher" in 2005, told Okayplayer news and culture editor Elijah Watson that while she was studying jazz at New York University, she learned the invocation Stay woke from Harlem alto saxophonist Lakecia Benjamin, who used the expression in the meaning of trying to "stay woke" because of tiredness or boredom, "talking about how she was trying to stay up – like literally not pass out". In homage, Muldrow wrote stay woke in marker on a T-shirt, which over time became suggestive of engaging in the process of the search for herself (as distinct from, for example, merely personal productivity).

According to The Economist, as the term woke and the #Staywoke hashtag began to spread online, the term "began to signify a progressive outlook on a host of issues as well as on race".
In a tweet mentioning the Russian feminist rock group Pussy Riot, whose members had been imprisoned in 2012, Badu wrote: "Truth requires no belief. Stay woke. Watch closely. #FreePussyRiot". This has been cited by Know Your Meme as one of the first examples of the #Staywoke hashtag.

2010s: Black Lives Matter

Following the shooting of Michael Brown in 2014, The phrase stay woke was used by activists of the Black Lives Matter (BLM) movement to urge awareness of police abuses. The BET documentary Stay Woke, which covered the movement, aired in May 2016. Within the decade of the 2010s, the word woke (the colloquial, passively voiced past participle of wake) obtained the meaning 'politically and socially aware' among BLM activists.

Broadening usage
While the term woke initially pertained to issues of racial prejudice and discrimination impacting African Americans, it was appropriated by other activist groups with different causes.
While there is no single agreed-upon definition of the term, it came to be primarily associated with ideas that involve identity and race and which are promoted by progressives, such as the notion of white privilege or slavery reparations for African Americans. Voxs Aja Romano writes that woke evolved into a "single-word summation of leftist political ideology, centered on social justice politics and critical race theory". Columnist David Brooks wrote in 2017 that "to be woke is to be radically aware and justifiably paranoid. It is to be cognizant of the rot pervading the power structures." Sociologist Marcyliena Morgan contrasts woke with cool in the context of maintaining dignity in the face of social injustice: "While coolness is empty of meaning and interpretation and displays no particular consciousness, woke is explicit and direct regarding injustice, racism, sexism, etc."

The term woke became increasingly common on Black Twitter, the community of African American users of the social media platform Twitter. André Brock, a professor of black digital studies at the Georgia Institute of Technology, suggested that the term proved popular on Twitter because its brevity suited the platform's 140-character limit. According to Charles Pulliam-Moore, the term began crossing over into general internet usage as early as 2015. The phrase stay woke became an Internet meme, with searches for woke on Google surging in 2015.

The term has gained popularity amid an increasing leftward turn on various issues among the American Left; this has partly been a reaction to the right-wing politics of U.S. President Donald Trump, who was elected in 2016, but also to a growing awareness regarding the extent of historical discrimination faced by African Americans. According to Perry Bacon Jr., ideas that have come to be associated with "wokeness" include a rejection of American exceptionalism; a belief that the United States has never been a true democracy; that people of color suffer from systemic and institutional racism; that white Americans experience white privilege; that African Americans deserve reparations for slavery and post-enslavement discrimination; that disparities among racial groups, for instance in certain professions or industries, are automatic evidence of discrimination; that U.S. law enforcement agencies are designed to discriminate against people of color and so should be defunded, disbanded, or heavily reformed; that women suffer from systemic sexism; that individuals should be able to identify with any gender or none; that U.S. capitalism is deeply flawed; and that Trump's election to the presidency was not an aberration but a reflection of the prejudices about people of color held by large parts of the U.S. population. Although increasingly accepted across much of the American Left, many of these ideas were nevertheless unpopular among the U.S. population as a whole and among other, especially more centrist, parts of the Democratic Party.

The term increasingly came to be identified with members of the millennial generation. In May 2016, MTV News identified woke as being among ten words teenagers "should know in 2016". The American Dialect Society voted woke the slang word of the year in 2017. In the same year, the term was included as an entry in Oxford English Dictionary.
By 2019, the term woke was increasingly being used in an ironic sense, as reflected in the books Woke by comedian Andrew Doyle (using the pen name Titania McGrath) and Anti-Woke by columnist Brendan O'Neill.
By 2022, usage of the term had spread beyond the United States, attracting criticism by right-wing political figures in Europe.

As a pejorative 
By 2019, opponents of progressive social movements were often using the term mockingly or sarcastically, implying that "wokeness" was an insincere form of performative activism.
British journalist Steven Poole comments that the term is used to mock "overrighteous liberalism".
In this pejorative sense, woke means "following an intolerant and moralising ideology".

United States 
Among American conservatives, woke has come to be used primarily as an insult. 
Members of the Republican Party have been increasingly using the term to criticize members of the Democratic Party, while more centrist Democrats use it against more left-leaning members of their own party; such critics accuse those on their left of using cancel culture to damage the employment prospects of those who are not considered sufficiently woke. Perry Bacon Jr. suggests that this "anti-woke posture" is connected to a long-standing promotion of backlash politics by the Republican Party, wherein it promotes white and conservative fear in response to activism by African Americans as well as changing cultural norms.
Such critics often believe that movements such as Black Lives Matter exaggerate the extent of social problems.

Among the uses by Republicans is the Stop WOKE Act, a law that limits discussion of racism in Florida schools. A program of eliminating books by LGBT and Black authors from schools was conduced by the Florida government and by vigilantes calling themselves "woke busters."

Linguist and social critic John McWhorter argues that the history of woke is similar to that of politically correct, another term once used self-descriptively by the left which was appropriated by the right as an insult, in a process similar to the euphemism treadmill.
Romano compares woke to canceled as a term for political correctness' gone awry" among the American right wing.
Attacking the idea of wokeness, along with other ideas such as cancel culture and critical race theory, became a large part of Republican Party electoral strategy. Former President Donald Trump stated in 2021 that the Biden administration was "destroying" the country "with woke", and Republican Missouri senator Josh Hawley used the term to promote his upcoming book by saying the "woke mob" was trying to suppress it.

Asia 
In Japan, the term has been used to describe Western progressive politics. It has most commonly been translated into Japanese as "", but also as "" (which is a Katakana form of the word "woke").

Canada 
The term is widely used in Canada as in the United States to describe progressive politics. During a debate in 2023 on the Law Society of Alberta's 2020 adoption of a rule which made certain Continuing Professional Development (CPD) training courses on Indigenous Canadian history obligatory, a lawyer from the Justice Centre for Constitutional Freedoms wrote an op-ed arguing that the course was a form of "wokeness".

Europe 
In a survey by YouGov, 73% of Britons said they used the term in a disapproving way and 11% in an approving way. In the United Kingdom, the term has also been used as a pejorative by conservative figures.

The phenomenon  has also seen use in French politics, particularly since the 2022 French presidential election. Much of the opposition to  sees it as an American import, incompatible with French values. Education minister Jean-Michel Blanquer established an "anti-woke think tank" in opposition to what is perceived as an export from the English-speaking world.

In Hungary, Hungarian politician Balázs Orbán stated that "we [Hungary] will not give up fighting against woke ideology".

In Sweden, singer Zara Larsson's commitment to expressions of "gender power", amongst other things, has been described as "very woke".

In Switzerland, politicians from and supporters of the Swiss People's Party criticized Swiss bank UBS for "woke culture".

Oceania 
During the 2022 Australian federal election campaign, both Scott Morrison, then-Prime Minister and leader of the centre-right Liberal-National Coalition, and Anthony Albanese, the current Prime Minister and leader of the centre-left Labor Party, insisted they were not "woke". Peter Dutton, current Opposition Leader and leader of the Coalition, has also used the term several times before. Members of minor right-wing parties, especially Pauline Hanson's One Nation and the United Australia Party, also frequently use the term.

In New Zealand, former Deputy Prime Minister and leader of the New Zealand First Party Winston Peters referred to the government led by Jacinda Ardern and the Labour Party as a "woke guilt industry". Then-Opposition Leader Judith Collins also referred to Ardern as "woke".

Reception 
Scholars Michael B. McCormack and Althea Legal-Miller argue that the phrase stay woke echoes Martin Luther King Jr.'s exhortation "to stay awake, to adjust to new ideas, to remain vigilant and to face the challenge of change".

Linguist Ben Zimmer writes that with mainstream currency, the term's "original grounding in African-American political consciousness has been obscured". The Economist states that as the term came to be used more to describe white people active on social media, black activists "criticised the performatively woke for being more concerned with internet point-scoring than systemic change". Journalist Amanda Hess says social media accelerated the word's cultural appropriation, writing, "The conundrum is built in. When white people aspire to get points for consciousness, they walk right into the cross hairs between allyship and appropriation." Hess describes woke as "the inverse of 'politically correct' [...] It means wanting to be considered correct, and wanting everyone to know just how correct you are".

Writer and activist Chloé Valdary has stated that the concept of being woke is a "double-edged sword" that can "alert people to systemic injustice" while also being "an aggressive, performative take on progressive politics that only makes things worse". Social-justice scholars Tehama Lopez Bunyasi and Candis Watts Smith, in their 2019 book Stay Woke: A People's Guide to Making All Black Lives Matter, argue against what they term as "Woker-than-Thou-itis: Striving to be educated around issues of social justice is laudable and moral, but striving to be recognized by others as a woke individual is self-serving and misguided." Essayist Maya Binyam, writing in The Awl, ironized about a seeming contest among players who "name racism when it appears" or who disparage "folk who are lagging behind".

In March 2021, Les Echos listed woke among eight words adopted by Generation Z that indicate "" ["a societal turning point"] in France.

The impact of "woke" sentiment on society has been criticised from various perspectives. In 2018, the British political commentator Andrew Sullivan described the "Great Awokening", describing it as a "cult of social justice on the left, a religion whose followers show the same zeal as any born-again Evangelical [Christian]" and who "punish heresy by banishing sinners from society or coercing them to public demonstrations of shame". In 2021, the British filmmaker and DJ Don Letts suggested that "in a world so woke you can't make a joke", it was difficult for young artists to make protest music without being accused of cultural appropriation.

In 2023, the way the term was used by conservatives was criticized as meaningless by several commentators. Referring to Fox News usage of the term, Amanda Marcotte wrote Woke' is very much meant to be a word that cannot be pinned to a definition. Its emptiness is what gives it so much power as a propaganda term." Thomas Chatterton Williams wrote that "they end up using this word as an epithet to refer—vaguely—to seemingly anything changing in the culture that they don’t like."

Woke-washing and woke capitalism

By the mid-2010s, language associated with wokeness had entered the mainstream media and was being used for marketing. Abas Mirzaei, a senior lecturer in branding at Macquarie University says that the term "has been cynically applied to everything from soft drink to razors". In 2018, African-American journalist Sam Sanders argued that the authentic meaning of woke was being lost to overuse by white liberals and co-option by businesses trying to appear progressive (woke-washing), which would ultimately create a backlash.

The term woke capitalism was coined by writer Ross Douthat for brands that used politically progressive messaging as a substitute for genuine reform. According to The Economist, examples of "woke capitalism" include advertising campaigns designed to appeal to millennials, who often hold more socially liberal views than earlier generations. These campaigns were often perceived by customers as insincere and inauthentic and provoked a backlash summarized by the phrase "get woke, go broke".

Cultural scientists Akane Kanai and Rosalind Gill describe "woke capitalism" as the "dramatically intensifying" trend to include historically marginalized groups (currently primarily in terms of race, gender and religion) as mascots in advertisement with a message of empowerment to signal progressive values. On the one hand, Kanai and Gill argue that this creates an individualized and depoliticized idea of social justice, reducing it to an increase in self-confidence; on the other hand, the omnipresent visibility in advertising can also amplify a backlash against the equality of precisely these minorities. These would become mascots not only of the companies using them, but of the unchallenged neoliberal economic system with its socially unjust order itself. For the economically weak, the equality of these minorities would thus become indispensable to the maintenance of this economic system; the minorities would be seen responsible for the losses of this system.

See also 

 African-American culture
 Culture war
 
 Moral entrepreneur

References

Further reading

External links
 

African-American English
Black Lives Matter
Social justice terminology
American political catchphrases
Political controversies
1940s neologisms
Pejorative terms